Holy Cross Cemetery is an active cemetery owned by the Roman Catholic Archdiocese of Philadelphia located in Delaware County, Pennsylvania. Established in 1890, Holy Cross was operated by the Archdiocese until 2014 when it turned over the care of its 13 cemeteries to StoneMor Inc.

Holy Cross was one of the busiest cemeteries in the Philadelphia region during the Spanish flu epidemic of 1918, requiring the employ of over 100 seminarians to bury the dead.

Notable Burials

B 
 William A. Barrett (1896–1976): Member of the United States House of Representatives
 Charlie Bastian (1860–1932): American baseball player
 Michael J. Bradley (1897–1979): Member of the United States House of Representatives
 Angelo Bruno (1910–1980): Boss of the Philadelphia crime family

D 
 "Wild Bill" Donovan (1876–1923): American baseball player and manager
 Grace Drayton (1878–1936): American cartoonist; creator of the Campbell's Kids

F 
 Thomas M. Foglietta (1928–2004): Member of the United States House of Representatives and US Ambassador to Italy

G 
 James A. Gallagher (1869–1957): Member of the United States House of Representatives
 Philip Gaughan (1865–1913): Spanish–American War Medal of Honor recipient
 Eusebio Guiteras (1823–1893): Cuban poet, author and separatist

H 
 Frank Hardart (1850–1918): German restaurateur
 H. H. Holmes (1861–1896): American con artist and serial killer

K 
 Jack Klotz (1932–2020): American football player

L 
 Eddie Lang (1902–1933): American guitarist, the "father of jazz guitar"
 Tommy Loughran (1902–1982): American boxer

M 
 Guy Marks (1923–1987): American actor, comedian, singer and impressionist
 John Marzano (1963–2008): American baseball player
 John McDermott (1891–1971): First American golfer to win the U.S. Open
 Robert N. McGarvey (1888–1952): Member of the United States House of Representatives
 Joseph McLaughlin (1867–1926): Member of the United States House of Representatives
 Billy McLean (1835–1927): English baseball umpire
 Thomas Murphy (1839–1900): Victoria Cross recipient

O 
 Michael H. O'Brien (1954–2018): Member of the Pennsylvania House of Representatives
 Philadelphia Jack O'Brien (1878–1942): American boxer
 Gilberto Owen (1904–1952): Mexican poet and diplomat

P 
 Frank Palermo (1905–1996): Boxing promoter and associate of the Philadelphia crime family
 George Crawford Platt (1842–1912): American Civil War Medal of Honor recipient
 Antonio Pollina (1892–1993): Boss of the Philadelphia crime family

R 
 Jerry Rullo (1923–2016): American basketball player

S 
 Frank Sheeran (1920–2003): International Brotherhood of Teamsters enforcer and subject of The Irishman
 William Shipman (1831–1894): American Civil War Medal of Honor recipient

T 
 Philip Testa (1924–1981): Boss of the Philadelphia crime family
 Salvatore Testa (1956–1984): Underboss of the Philadelphia crime family
 Frank Tinney (1878–1940): American comedian and actor

V 
 Louis Van Zelst (1895–1915): American batboy and mascot for the Philadelphia Athletics
 Mary Varallo (1897–1979): Member of the Pennsylvania House of Representatives and Philadelphia City Council

See also 
 Roman Catholic Archdiocese of Philadelphia
 Holy Sepulchre Cemetery (Cheltenham Township, Pennsylvania)

References 

Catholic cemeteries in the United States
Cemeteries established in the 1890s
Cemeteries in Delaware County, Pennsylvania
1890 establishments in Pennsylvania
Roman Catholic cemeteries in Pennsylvania
Cemeteries in Pennsylvania